James Donald Bratt (born 1949) is a scholar of Abraham Kuyper, and is an emeritus professor at Calvin College.

An alumnus of Calvin, Bratt received his Doctor of Philosophy degree from Yale University after writing his dissertation, Dutch Calvinism in Modern America.  He has published a biography of Kuyper in 2013. His other areas of specialty include colonial American history, and American intellectual and religious history.

Bibliography
Dutch Calvinism in Modern America (Eerdmans, 1984) 
Abraham Kuyper: A Centennial Reader (Eerdmans, 1998) 
Antirevivalism in Antebellum America: A Collection of Religious Voices (editor) (Rutgers University Press, 2005) 
Abraham Kuyper: Modern Calvinist, Christian Democrat (Eerdmans, 2013)

References

1949 births
20th-century American historians
20th-century American male writers
21st-century American historians
21st-century American male writers
American historians of religion
Calvin University alumni
Calvin University faculty
Historians of Christianity
Historians of the United States
Intellectual historians
Living people
Yale University alumni
American male non-fiction writers